Lunhui (轮回) English name Again, is a Chinese rock band formed in 1991. It was one of the first Beijing rock groups to sign with a Japanese label, signing with JVC and producing the album Xīnlèjí (心乐集) in 1997.

Discography
 Chuangzao 创造 1995 cassette
 Xinleji 心乐集 1997 JVC
 Chun qu chun lai 春去春来 single 2000
 Wo de taiyang 我的太阳 2002
 Chaoyue 超越 2002 
 Qidai 期待 2004

References

Chinese rock music groups
Musical groups from Beijing